The Stradbroke Handicap is a Brisbane Racing Club Group 1 Thoroughbred open handicap horse race, run over a distance of 1,400 metres at Eagle Farm Racecourse, Brisbane in June during the Queensland Winter Racing Carnival.  It is one of the highlight races on the Brisbane Winter Racing Carnival with total prize money of A$1,500,000

History

The race is named after Lord Stradbroke, relative to Henry John Rous, originator of the weight-for-age scale in thoroughbred racing.

Five two-year-olds have won the race, the last was Wiggle, carrying 7 stone 5 pounds (~46.5 kg) in 1958. The 1,400 metre race and track record is 1:20.2 established by Toledo in 1998.
Between 1982 and 1988 the race was known as the Elders Handicap.

Distance
In 1890 the Stradbroke Handicap was a Principal race run over six furlongs (~1,200m), when it was won by Pyrrhus.

The distance was changed in 1953 to 7 furlongs and in 1972 to the current distance of 1,400 metres.

Due to track reconstruction of Eagle Farm Racecourse for the 2014–15 racing season the event was transferred to Doomben Racecourse over a slightly shorter distance of 1350 metres.

Winners

 2022 - Alligator Blood
 2021 - Tofane
 2020 - Tyzone
 2019 - Trekking
 2018 - Santa Ana Lane
 2017 - Impending
 2016 - Under The Louvre
 2015 - Srikandi
 2014 - River Lad
 2013 - Linton
 2012 - Mid Summer Music
 2011 - Sincero
 2010 - Black Piranha
 2009 - Black Piranha
 2008 - Mr Baritone
 2007 - Sniper's Bullet
 2006 - La Montagna
 2005 - St. Basil
 2004 - Thorn Park
 2003 - Private Steer
 2002 - Show A Heart
 2001 - Crawl
 2000 - Landsighting
 1999 - Adam
 1998 - Toledo
 1997 - Dane Ripper
 1996 - Danasinga
 1995 - Rouslan
 1994 - All Our Mob
 1993 - Never Undercharge
 1992 - Rough Habit
 1991 - Rough Habit
 1990 - Plush Embassy
 1989 - Robian Steel
 1988 - Campaign King
 1987 - Dancing Poet
 1986 - Daybreak Lover
 1985 - Canterbury Belle
 1984 - Daybreak Lover
 1983 - Brenlaine
 1982 - Grey Receiver
 1981 - Watney
 1980 - Bemboka Yacht
 1979 - Imposing
 1978 - Innisfree
 1977 - Sir Wisp
 1976 - Manawapoi
 1975 - Spedito
 1974 - Go Fun
 1973 - Lucky Cloud
 1972 - Triton
 1971 - Rajah Sahib
 1970 - Divide And Rule
 1969 - Prince Medes
 1968 - Cabochon
 1967 - Mister Hush
 1966 - Castanea
 1965 - Winfreux
 1964 - Cele's Image
 1963 - Mullala
 1962 - Kilshery
 1961 - Persian Lyric
 1960 - Wallgar
 1959 - Grey Ghost
 1958 - ‡Wiggle
 1957 - Kingster
 1956 - Knave
 1955 - Plato
 1954 - Karendi
 1953 - Suncup
 1952 - Wedborough
 1951 - Aqua Regis
 1950 - Lucky Ring
 1949 - Lucky Ring
 1948 - Ballyvista
 1947 - Hedui
 1946 - Abbeville
 1942–45 - race not held
 1941 - High Rank
 1940 - Heroic's Double
 1939 - Bahwing
 1938 - Thurles Lad
 1937 - King Merlin
 1936 - Capris
 1935 - Petrol Lager
 1934 - Petrol Lager
 1933 - Sun Eagle
 1932 - Credence
 1931 - Lady Linden   
 1930 - Will Yet
 1929 - I.O.U.
 1928 - Sarlind
 1927 - Running Girl
 1926 - Highland
 1925 - Highland 
 1924 - Molly Cyrus
 1923 - Lady Aura
 1922 - Laneffe
 1921 - Syceonelle
 1920 - Syce Lad
 1919 - Gold Tie
 1918 - Gold Tie
 1917 - Sydney Damsel
 1916 - ‡Amberdown
 1915 - Cairn Wallace
 1914 - Malt Mark
 1913 - ‡Line Gun
 1912 - Pittsworth Gun
 1911 - Lady Hope
 1910 - Bright Laddie
 1909 - Storm King
 1908 - Satisfair
 1907 - Jessie's Dream
 1906 - Darelong
 1905 - Ruscity
 1904 - Forge
 1903 - ‡Fitz Grafton
 1902 - Blunderer
 1901 - Glengarry 
 1900 - Prince Edward
 1899 - ‡Sweetheart
 1898 - Boreas Ii
 1897 - †The Scamp/Dalnair
 1896 - Babel
 1895 - Babel 
 1894 - Studbook
 1893 - Rosy Dawn
 1892 - Tallboy
 1891 - Dan O'Connell  
 1890 - Pyrrhus

See also
 List of Australian Group races
 Group races

References

Group 1 stakes races in Australia
Open mile category horse races